"Beautiful Life" is a song by English singer and songwriter Rick Astley. It was released as a digital download in the United Kingdom on 1 June 2018 as the lead single from his eighth studio album Beautiful Life (2018). The song has charted in Belgium. The song was also written and produced by Astley.

In 2019, Astley recorded and released a 'Reimagined' version of the song for his album The Best of Me.

Music video
A music video to accompany the release of "Beautiful Life" was first released onto YouTube on 5 July 2018 at a total length of two minutes and fifty-seven seconds. It features men and women of different ages, races and looks all dressed in black and white clothes singing and dancing to the song in the same room, along with Astley himself

Track listing

Charts

Release history

References

2018 songs
2018 singles
Rick Astley songs
Songs written by Rick Astley